The 1999 Girabola was the 21st season of top-tier football competition in Angola. The season ran from 18 April to 22 November 1999. Primeiro de Agosto were the defending champions.

The league comprised 14 teams, the bottom three of which were relegated to the 2000 Gira Angola.

Primeiro de Agosto were crowned champions, winning their 8th title, while Independente do Tômbwa and Progresso do Sambizanga, were relegated.

Boelua Lokuli aka Isaac of Primeiro de Agosto finished as the top scorer with 19 goals.

Changes from the 1998 season
Relegated: Chicoil, Kabuscorp, SECIL  
Promoted: Cambondo, Inter de Luanda, Ferroviário da Huíla *
 Note: Ferroviário da Huíla withdrew after being promoted, hence the tournament was contested by 15 teams, instead of 16.

League table

Results

Season statistics

Top scorer
  Boelua Lokuli Isaac

Champions

References

External links
Girabola 1999 standings at girabola.com
Federação Angolana de Futebol

1999 in Angolan football
Girabola seasons
Angola
Angola